The 2011–12 VfL Bochum season was the 74th season in club history.

Matches

Legend

Friendly matches

2. Bundesliga

DFB-Pokal

Squad

Squad and statistics

Squad, appearances and goals scored

Minutes played

Bookings

Transfers

Summer

In:

Out:

Winter

In:

Out:

Sources

External links
 2011–12 VfL Bochum season at Weltfussball.de 
 2011–12 VfL Bochum season at kicker.de 
 2011–12 VfL Bochum season at Fussballdaten.de 

Bochum
VfL Bochum seasons